Whitehall State Park is a Massachusetts state park located in the town of Hopkinton and managed by the Department of Conservation and Recreation. The park was created in 1947 when the Whitehall Reservoir was removed from service as a water source for the Greater Boston area.

Activities and amenities
The park features fishing, boating, hiking trails, and ice fishing.

References

External links
Whitehall State Park Department of Conservation and Recreation
Whitehall State Park Map Department of Conservation and Recreation

State parks of Massachusetts
Parks in Middlesex County, Massachusetts
1947 establishments in Massachusetts
Protected areas established in 1947